= Loosehead prop =

Loosehead prop is the positioning of a player in the scrums of both rugby football sports:

- Prop forward the left-prop in rugby league football
- Loosehead prop (rugby union) in rugby union football
